The Hundred of Field is a cadastral hundred of the County of Cardwell (South Australia), centred on the rural localities of Field and Colebatch, South Australia. It was proclaimed by Governor Winston Dugan in 1938 and named for Edgar John Field, a local government administrator of the day.

References

Field